Sphaerosyllis bardukaciculata is a species belonging to the phylum Annelida, a group known as the segmented worms. Sphaerosyllis bardukaciculatan is similar to Sphaerosyllis aciculata from Florida; its chaetae are almost identical; the former, however, differs by having longer antennae and anal cirri, as well as parapodial glands with granular material. The animal's name is derived from the Aboriginal word barduk, meaning "near", alluding to the aforementioned likeness with S. aciculata.

Description
It possesses short papillae on its dorsum. Its prostomium is ovate, covered dorsally in part by the peristomium, showing 4 large eyes in a trapezoidal arrangement. Its antennae are longer than the prostomium, shorter than the combined length of its prostomium and palps. The palps are fused along their length, eliciting a dorsal furrow.

Its dorsal cirri are short on its anterior segments, while a bit longer on its midbody and posterior segments; cirri are absent on chaetiger 2. Its parapodial glands are small, present from chaetigers 4-5.

It shows anterior parapodia with 3-4 compound chaetae, with short and unidentate blades. The blades of these compound chaetae possess short, marginal spines which are longer on the most dorsal chaetae. Sphaerosyllis bardukaciculata shows four simple chaetae on the posterior parapodia. It counts with a single acicula, bent distally to a right angle.

The pharynx spans approximately three segments. Its pharyngeal tooth is long, located on the anterior margin. Its proventricle spans through two segments, with 23 muscle cell rows. Its pygidium is small, with long papillae and two anal cirri.

Distribution
Its distribution is thought to include the whole of Queensland.

References

Further reading
Alvarez, Patricia, and Guillermo San Martin. "A new species of Sphaerosyllis (Annelida: Polychaeta: Syllidae) from Cuba, with a list of syllids from the Guanahacabibes Biosphere Reserve (Cuba)." Journal of the Marine Biological Association of the United Kingdom 89.07 (2009): 1427–1435.
Aguado, M. Teresa, Arne Nygren, and Mark E. Siddall. "Phylogeny of Syllidae (Polychaeta) based on combined molecular analysis of nuclear and mitochondrial genes." Cladistics 23.6 (2007): 552–564.
Aguado, M. Teresa, Guillermo San Martín, and Mark E. Siddall. "Systematics and evolution of syllids (Annelida, Syllidae)." Cladistics 28.3 (2012): 234–250.

External links

WORMS entry

Syllidae
Animals described in 2005